St. Petersburg International Legal Forum is an annual international legal conference that was established in 2011 on the initiative of the Ministry of Justice of the Russian Federation and is supported by the President of the Russian Federation. IT occurs annually in Saint Petersburg.

References

External links
 

Legal conferences
Culture in Saint Petersburg